Stegnosperma is a genus of flowering plants, consisting of three species of woody plants, native to the Caribbean, Central America, and the Sonoran Desert. These are shrubs or lianas, with anomalous secondary thickening in mature stems, by successive cambia.

Leaves are alternate, entire, 2–5 cm in length, tapering at both ends. Flowers are small (5–8 mm), five-merous, with white petal-like sepals, and a superior ovary. They are arranged in short racemes, usually no more than 10 cm long, shorter in S. watsonii. The fruit is a capsule 5–8 mm in diameter: it contains small (2–3 mm) black seeds with a conspicuous reddish aril.

The genus has commonly been treated as belonging to the family Phytolaccaceae, but the APG system and APG II system, of 2003, regard it as the sole genus of its own family, the Stegnospermataceae and assign it to the order Caryophyllales in the clade core eudicots

Turner et al. suggest that S. halimifolium Bentham and S. watsonii D.J. Rogers are actually the same species, observing that specimens from the gulf coast of Sonora have intermediate characteristics. Whether one species or two, they are locally common all along the Gulf of California, where they are found on the coastal strand and some inland washes, always at low elevations (less than 600 m).

Anatomy
Stem and root anatomy was originally thought to be normal, but this was due to the small diameter of herbarium specimens examined by early researchers. Anomalous secondary thickening by successive cambia has been described in detail within mature stems and roots.<ref>Horak, K. E. Anomalous Secondary Thickening in Stegnosperma'.  Bulletin of the Torrey Botanical Club, 1981, 108:189-209.</ref>S. Carlquist. Wood and Stem Anatomy of Stegnosperma (Caryophyllales); Phylogenetic Relationships; Nature of Lateral Meristems and Successive Cambial Activity. JAWA Journal, 1999, 20(2):149—163.

Uses
In traditional medicine, curanderas use an extract of the root as a part of the treatment for rabies due to its emetic properties.  Jiménez-Estrada et al. list Stegnosperma extract for treatment of headache, snakebite, and rabies.  They provide an analysis of the antioxidant and antiproliferative activity of S. halimifolium.

References

 Raymond M. Turner, Janice E. Bowers, and Tony L. Burgess, Sonoran Desert Plants: an Ecological Atlas (Tucson: The University of Arizona Press, 1995) pp. 373–375

External links
 Stegnospermataceae in L. Watson and M.J. Dallwitz (1992 onwards). The families of flowering plants: descriptions, illustrations, identification, information retrieval.'' Version: 30 May 2006. http://delta-intkey.com
 NCBI Taxonomy Browser

Caryophyllales
Caryophyllales genera
Taxa named by Takenoshin Nakai